Eotomarioidea is an extinct superfamily of small to large sea snails, marine gastropod mollusks in the clade Vetigastropoda.

Taxonomy 
 Family Eotomariidae  Wenz, 1938 
 Family Gosseletinidae  Wenz, 1938 
 Family Luciellidae  Knight, 1956 
 Family Phanerotrematidae  Knight, 1956

References

External links

Vetigastropoda